Jordančo Stojmenovski (born 11 March 1978) is a retired Macedonian football defender.

References

1978 births
Living people
Association football defenders
Macedonian footballers
North Macedonia international footballers
FK Makedonija Gjorče Petrov players
FK Pelister players
FK Belasica players
Macedonian First Football League players